Suriname competed at the 1988 Summer Olympics in Seoul, South Korea. The nation won its first ever Olympic medal at these Games. Six competitors, four men and two women, took part in ten events in four sports.

Medalists

Competitors
The following is the list of number of competitors in the Games.

Athletics

Men

Women

Cycling

One male cyclist represented Suriname in 1988.

Road

Track
Pursuit

Judo

Men

Swimming

Men

References

External links
Official Olympic Reports
International Olympic Committee results database

Nations at the 1988 Summer Olympics
1988
Oly